Network Culture. Politics for the Information Age is a 2004 book by Italian scholar Tiziana Terranova, focusing on the effects of information technology on society.

References 

2004 non-fiction books
Books about the Internet